José Paciano Laurel y García  (March 9, 1891 – November 6, 1959) was a Filipino politician, lawyer, and judge, who served as the president of the Japanese-occupied Second Philippine Republic, a puppet state during World War II, from 1943 to 1945. Since the administration of President Diosdado Macapagal (1961–1965), Laurel has been officially recognized by later administrations as a former president of the Philippines.

Early life and career

José Paciano Laurel y García was born on March 9, 1891, in the town of Tanauan, Batangas. His parents were Sotero Laurel y Remoquillo and Jacoba García y Pimentel, both from Tanauan. His father had been an official in the revolutionary government of Emilio Aguinaldo and a signatory to the 1899 Malolos Constitution. Just like many other presidents, he is a Chinese mestizo descendant. His second given name Paciano was in honor of Paciano Rizal.

Laurel studied at the San Jose College in Tanauan before transferring in 1903 to Colegio de San Juan de Letran in Manila. He later attended "La Regeneracion," where he completed the Spanish secondary course of instruction. In 1907, he finished the intermediate grades at Manila public schools.

While a teen, Laurel was indicted for attempted murder when he almost killed a rival suitor of the girl he stole a kiss from with a fan knife. While studying and finishing law school, he argued for and received an acquittal in 1912.

Laurel completed his high school education at Manila High School in 1911. He received his law degree from the University of the Philippines College of Law in 1915, where he studied under Dean George A. Malcolm, whom he would later succeed at the Supreme Court of the Philippines. On the same year, he took the Philippine bar examination and placed second. He then obtained a Master of Laws degree from University of Santo Tomas in 1919. Laurel was later awarded a scholarship at Yale Law School, where he obtained his J.S.D. degree in 1920. On the same year, he was admitted to the Bar by the Supreme Court of the United States and the Supreme Court and Court of Appeals of the District of Columbia. He later traveled extensively throughout the United States and Europe, where he also took special courses in international law at Oxford University in England and at the University of Paris in France before returning to the Philippines in 1921. He also earned his Doctorate in Jurisprudence at the Escuela de Derecho in Manila and Humanities at the University of Santo Tomas.

Laurel began his life in public service while a student, as a messenger in the Bureau of Forestry, then as a clerk in the Code Committee tasked with the codification of Philippine laws, and law clerk in the Executive Bureau. During his work for the Code Committee, he was introduced to its head, Thomas A. Street, a future Supreme Court Justice who would be a mentor to the young Laurel.

In 1921, Laurel was also appointed as lecturer at University of the Philippines, particularly at the College of Liberal Arts and at the College of Law.

Laurel was appointed first as ad interim Undersecretary of the Interior Department in 1922 (with two stints as acting secretary), then promoted as Secretary of the Interior in 1923. In that post, he would frequently clash with the American Governor-General Leonard Wood, and eventually, in 1923, resign from his position together with other Cabinet members in protest of Wood's administration. His clashes with Wood solidified Laurel's nationalist credentials.

Laurel was a member of the Philippine fraternity Upsilon Sigma Phi.

Senator and Congressman of the Philippines
In 1925, Laurel was elected to the Philippine Senate, beating incumbent Senator Antero Soriano. Serving from the 5th district, he would serve for one term before losing his re-election bid in 1931 to fellow Batangueño Claro M. Recto.

He retired to private practice, but by 1934, he was again elected to public office, this time as a delegate to the 1935 Constitutional Convention. Hailed as one of the "Seven Wise Men of the Convention", he would sponsor the provisions on the Bill of Rights. Following the ratification of the 1935 Constitution and the establishment of the Commonwealth of the Philippines, Laurel was appointed Associate Justice of the Supreme Court on February 29, 1936.

Associate Justice of the Supreme Court
Laurel's Supreme Court tenure may have been overshadowed by his presidency, yet he remains one of the most important Supreme Court justices in Philippine history. He authored several leading cases still analyzed to this day that defined the parameters of the branches of government as well as their powers.

Angara v. Electoral Commission, 63 Phil. 139 (1936), which is considered as the Philippine equivalent of Marbury v. Madison, 5 U.S. (1 Cranch) 137 (1803), is Laurel's most important contribution to jurisprudence and even the rule of law in the Philippines. In affirming that the Court had jurisdiction to review the rulings of the Electoral Commission organized under the National Assembly, the Court, through Justice Laurel's opinion, firmly entrenched the power of Philippine courts to engage in judicial review of the acts of the other branches of government, and to interpret the Constitution. Held the Court, through Laurel:
The Constitution is a definition of the powers of government. Who is to determine the nature, scope and extent of such powers? The Constitution itself has provided for the instrumentality of the judiciary as the rational way. And when the judiciary mediates to allocate constitutional boundaries, it does not assert any superiority over the other departments; it does not in reality nullify or invalidate an act of the legislature, but only asserts the solemn and sacred obligation assigned to it by the Constitution to determine conflicting claims of authority under the Constitution and to establish for the parties in an actual controversy the rights which that instrument secures and guarantees to them.

Another highly influential decision penned by Laurel was Ang Tibay v. CIR, 69 Phil. 635 (1940). The Court acknowledged in that case that the substantive and procedural requirements before proceedings in administrative agencies, such as labor relations courts, were more flexible than those in judicial proceedings. At the same time, the Court still asserted that the right to due process of law must be observed, and enumerated the "cardinal primary rights" that must be respected in administrative proceedings. Since then, these "cardinal primary rights" have stood as the standard in testing due process claims in administrative cases.

Calalang v. Williams, 70 Phil. 726 (1940) was a seemingly innocuous case involving a challenge raised by a private citizen to a traffic regulation banning kalesas from Manila streets during certain afternoon hours. The Court, through Laurel, upheld the regulation as within the police power of the government. But in rejecting the claim that the regulation was violative of social justice, Laurel would respond with what would become his most famous aphorism, which is to this day widely quoted by judges and memorized by Filipino law students:
Social justice is neither communism, nor despotism, nor atomism, nor anarchy, but the humanization of laws and the equalization of social and economic forces by the State so that justice in its rational and objectively secular conception may at least be approximated. Social justice means the promotion of the welfare of all the people, the adoption by the Government of measures calculated to insure economic stability of all the competent elements of society, through the maintenance of a proper economic and social equilibrium in the interrelations of the members of the community, constitutionally, through the adoption of measures legally justifiable, or extra-constitutionally, through the exercise of powers underlying the existence of all governments on the time-honored principle of salus populi est suprema lex. Social justice, therefore, must be founded on the recognition of the necessity of interdependence among divers and diverse units of a society and of the protection that should be equally and evenly extended to all groups as a combined force in our social and economic life, consistent with the fundamental and paramount objective of the state of promoting the health, comfort, and quiet of all persons, and of bringing about "the greatest good to the greatest number.

While an associate justice, Laurel also held other appointive posts. Laurel was appointed by President Manuel L. Quezon as a member of the Moral Code Committee in 1939 and as member of the Code Committee in 1940. In 1941, he was also appointed as Professor of Civil Law at the Central College of Law. He was also named as acting Secretary of Justice and acting Chief Justice on December of the same year and Commissioner of Justice in January 1942. His time as associate justice ended on February 5, 1942

Cabinet member and accession
As he was well known to the Japanese as a critic of US rule, as well as having demonstrated a willingness to serve under the Japanese Military Administration, he held a series of high posts in 1942–1943.

On December 10, 1941, then-Associate Justice Laurel was appointed by President Manuel L. Quezon as acting Secretary of Justice. He was later appointed Commissioner of Justice by the commander-in-chief of the Imperial Japanese Forces on January 26, 1942, but was effective three days prior. However, on December 2, 1942, he was relieved from the post to become the Minister of the Interior, a position that he had previously held as Secretary two decades prior. He relinquished the post on October 14, 1943, when he was inaugurated President of the Second Philippine Republic.

Laurel was among the Commonwealth officials instructed by the Japanese Imperial Army to form a provisional government when they invaded and occupied the country. He cooperated with the Japanese, in contrast to Chief Justice José Abad Santos, who was shot for refusing to cooperate.

Assassination attempt 
On June 5, 1943, Laurel was playing golf at the Wack Wack Golf and Country Club, then in the City of Greater Manila, when he was shot around four times with a .45 caliber pistol. The bullets barely missed his heart and liver. He was rushed by his golfing companions, among them Far Eastern University president Nicanor Reyes Sr., to the Philippine General Hospital where he was operated by the Chief Military Surgeon of the Japanese Military Administration and Filipino surgeons. Laurel enjoyed a speedy recovery.

Two suspects to the shooting were reportedly captured and swiftly executed by the Kempetai. Another suspect, a former boxer named Feliciano Lizardo, was presented for identification by the Japanese to Laurel at the latter's hospital bed, but Laurel then professed unclear memory.

However, in his 1953 memoirs, Laurel would admit that Lizardo, by then one of his bodyguards who had pledged to give his life for him, was indeed the would-be-assassin. Still, the historian Teodoro Agoncillo in his book on the Japanese occupation, identified a captain with a guerilla unit as the shooter.

Presidency

The presidency of Laurel understandably remains one of the most controversial in Philippine history. After the war, he would be denounced by the pro-American sectors as a war collaborator or even a traitor, although his indictment for treason was superseded by President Roxas' Amnesty Proclamation.

Accession

When Japan invaded, President Manuel L. Quezon first fled to Bataan and then to the United States to establish a government-in-exile. Quezon ordered Laurel, Vargas and other cabinet members to stay. Laurel's prewar, close relationship with Japanese officials (a son had been sent to study at the Imperial Japanese Army Academy in Tokyo, and Laurel had received an honorary doctorate from Tokyo Imperial University) in 1938, placed him in a good position to interact with the Japanese occupation forces.

Under vigorous Japanese influence, the National Assembly selected Laurel to serve as president in 1943. He took the oath of office on October 14, 1943, at the Legislative Building (now the National Museum of Fine Arts) in Manila. The oath was administered by Chief Justice José Yulo.

Administration and cabinet

Domestic problems

Economy
During Laurel's tenure as president, hunger was the main worry. Prices of essential commodities rose to unprecedented heights. The government exerted every effort to increase production and bring consumers' goods under control. However, Japanese rapacity had the better of it all. On the other hand, guerrilla activities and Japanese retaliatory measures brought the peace and order situation to a difficult point. Resorting to district-zoning and domiciliary searches, coupled with arbitrary arrests, the Japanese made the mission of Laurel's administration incalculably exasperating and perilous.

Food shortage
During his presidency, the Philippines faced a crippling food shortage which demanded much of Laurel's attention. Rice and bread were still available but the sugar supply was gone.

Foreign policies

Philippine-Japanese Treaty of Alliance
On October 20, 1943, the Philippine-Japanese Treaty of Alliance was signed by Claro M. Recto, who was appointed by Laurel as his Foreign Minister, and Japanese Ambassador to Philippines Sozyo Murata. One redeeming feature was that no conscription was envisioned.

Greater East Asia Conference

Shortly after the inauguration of the Second Philippine Republic, President Laurel, together with cabinet Ministers Recto and Paredes flew to Tokyo to attend the Greater East Asia Conference which was an international summit held in Tokyo, Japan from November 5 – 6, 1943, in which Japan hosted the heads of state of various component members of the Greater East Asia Co-Prosperity Sphere. The conference was also referred to as the Tokyo Conference.

The Conference addressed few issues of any substance, Eradication of Western Opium Drug Trade and to illustrate the Empire of Japan's commitments to the Pan-Asianism ideal and to emphasize its role as the "liberator" of Asia from Western colonialism.

Martial law
Laurel declared the country under martial law in 1944 through Proclamation No. 29, dated September 21. Martial law came into effect on September 22, 1944, at 9 am. Proclamation No. 30 was issued the next day, declaring the existence of a state of war between the Philippines and the United States and the United Kingdom. This took effect on September 23, 1944, at 10:00 A.M.

Filipinization of the Catholic Church 
On the day of his inauguration, Laurel sought to gain recognition for the new republic from the Holy See. Correspondence between the diplomats of the Vatican and Japan told that the Holy See did not wish to recognize any new states for the duration of the War. Despite this, Laurel still sought to appeal to the Pope about instating Filipinos into the Church hierarchy.

Resistance

Due to the nature of Laurel's government and its connection to Japan, much of the population actively resisted his presidency, instead supporting the exiled Commonwealth government.

Dissolution of the regime

On July 26, 1945, the Potsdam Declaration served upon Japan an ultimatum to surrender or face utter annihilation. The Japanese government refused the offer. On August 6, 1945, Hiroshima, with some 300,000 inhabitants, was almost totally destroyed by an atomic bomb dropped from an American plane. Two days later, the Soviet Union declared war against Japan and invaded Manchuria. The next day, August 9, 1945, a second atomic bomb was dropped on Nagasaki. The Allied Forces' message now had a telling effect: Japan unconditionally surrendered to the Allied Powers on August 15, 1945.

Beginning in March 1945, President Laurel, together with his family, Camilo Osías, Benigno Aquino Sr., Gen. Mateo M. Capinpin, and Jorge B. Vargas evacuated to Baguio. Shortly after the city fell, they traveled to Tuguegarao, where they embarked a bomber plane to Japan via Formosa (now Taiwan) and Shanghai, China. On August 17, 1945, from Nara Hotel in Nara, Japan, President Laurel issued an Executive Proclamation which declared the dissolution of his regime.

President Laurel is the only Philippine president who served the three branches of government. He became a senator-congressman, associate justice and a president of the Second Republic.

Post-presidency

Collaboration trial and imprisonment
On September 2, 1945, the Japanese forces formally surrendered to the United States. Gen. Douglas MacArthur ordered Laurel arrested for collaborating with the Japanese. Alongside his son Jose Laurel III and Benigno Aquino Sr., he was taken to custody and was imprisoned in Yokohama on September 15, 1945. On November 16, 1945, they were transferred to Sugamo Prison. While in prison, he was not allowed to have any reading material except The World in 2030 A.D., a book by the Earl of Birkenhead that he received as a gift from his son Salvador. Lacked in writing instruments, he used this book to write his Memoirs.

On July 23, 1946, Laurel, together with Osias, Aquino, and his son Jose III, left Tokyo for Manila, having been turned over to the Republic of the Philippines. One month later, he was placed under technical custody at his Peñafrancia house in Paco, Manila but rather than accepting the given conditions, he preferred to be imprisoned at the New Bilibid Prison in Muntinlupa, Rizal. He was later provisionally released in September 1946 after posting a  bail. He was also charged with 132 counts of treason in 1946 and was tried by the People's Court. However, the trial ended prematurely due to the general amnesty granted by President Manuel Roxas in 1948.

1949 presidential election
Laurel ran for president as a nominee of the Nacionalista Party against Elpidio Quirino in 1949 but lost in what future Foreign Affairs Secretary Carlos P. Romulo and Marvin M. Gray considered as the dirtiest election in Philippine electoral history.

Return to the Senate

Laurel garnered more than 2 million votes and was elected to the Senate as the top vote getter in 1951, under the Nacionalista Party. He was urged to run for president in 1953, but declined, working instead for the successful election of Ramon Magsaysay. Magsaysay appointed Laurel head of a mission tasked with negotiating trade and other issues with United States officials, the result being known as the Laurel–Langley Agreement. Laurel was also named as chairman of the Senate Committee on Education, which he held when he sponsored in 1955 a bill that would make José Rizal's two novels, Noli Me Tángere and El filibusterismo, as compulsory readings in all universities and colleges.

Retirement and death
Laurel considered his election to the Senate as a vindication of his reputation. He declined to run for re-election in 1957. He retired from public life, concentrating on the development of the Lyceum of the Philippines established by his family, as well as the Philippine Banking Corporation which he had established.

During his retirement, Laurel resided in a 1957 3-story, 7-bedroom mansion in Mandaluyong, Rizal, dubbed "Villa Pacencia" after Laurel's wife. The home was one of three residences constructed by the Laurel family, the other two being in Tanauan, Batangas and in Paco, Manila (called "Villa Peñafrancia"). In 2008, the Laurel family sold "Villa Pacencia" to then-Senate President Manny Villar and his wife Cynthia.

In 1958, Laurel launched an organization known as Committee of Citizens, which he headed. On the same year, it was announced that his book entitled Thinking of Ourselves would be launched and The Manila Times announced the launching of Unity Movement for National Survival that he sponsored. On his 68th birthday on March 9, 1959, President Carlos P. Garcia conferred him the award of Philippine Legion of Honor with the degree of Chief Commander.

In the early afternoon of November 5, 1959, Laurel suffered a stroke. On November 6, 1959, at 1:00 in the morning, he died at Our Lady of Lourdes Hospital in Manila, from a massive heart attack and cerebral hemorrhage. He was interred three days later at what is now Tanauan City Public Cemetery in Tanauan, Batangas.

Honors 
National Honor
 : Philippine Legion of Honor, Chief Commander - (1959)
 : Knights of Rizal, Knight Grand Cross

Personal life
He married Pacencia Hidalgo on April 9, 1911. The couple had nine children:
 Jose Bayani Laurel Jr. (August 27, 1912 – March 11, 1998), member of the Philippine National Assembly from Batangas from 1943 to 1944, Congressman from Batangas's third district from 1941 to 1957 and from 1961 to 1972, Speaker of the House of Representatives of the Philippines from 1954 to 1957 and from 1967 to 1971, Assemblyman of Regular Batasang Pambansa from 1984 to 1986, Member of the Philippine Constitutional Commission of 1986 in 1986, and a vice presidential candidate of the Nacionalista Party in Philippine presidential election of 1957
 Jose Sotero Laurel III (August 27, 1914 – January 6, 2003), ambassador to Japan
 Natividad Laurel-Guinto (born December 25, 1916)
 Sotero Cosme Laurel II (September 27, 1918 – September 16, 2009), Senator of the Philippines from 1987 to 1992 became Senate President pro tempore from 1990 to 1992
 Mariano Antonio Laurel (January 17, 1922 – August 2, 1979)
 Rosenda Pacencia Laurel-Avanceña (born January 9, 1925)
 Potenciana "Nita" Laurel-Yupangco (born May 19, 1926)
 Salvador Roman Laurel (November 18, 1928 – January 27, 2004), Senator of the Philippines from 1967 to 1972, Prime Minister of the Philippines in  1986, Secretary of Foreign Affairs of the Philippines from 1986 to 1987, Vice President of the Philippines from 1986 to 1992 and a presidential candidate of the Nacionalista Party in Philippine presidential election of 1992
 Arsenio Laurel (December 14, 1931 – November 19, 1967), first two-time winner of the Macau Grand Prix in 1962 and 1963

Descendants
 Roberto Laurel, grandson, President of Lyceum of the Philippines University-Manila and Lyceum of the Philippines University-Cavite, son of Sotero Laurel (3rd son of José P. Laurel)
 Peter Laurel, grandson, President of Lyceum of the Philippines University-Batangas and Lyceum of the Philippines University-Laguna
 Franco Laurel, grandson, singer and actor 
 Rajo Laurel, grandson, fashion designer  
 Carlos "Chuck" Perez Laurel, grandson
 Luis Marcos "Mark" Laurel, grandson, lawyer, son of Sotero Laurel (3rd son of José P. Laurel)
 Jose Bayani "JB" Laurel Jr., UNIDO Party list, grandson
 José Laurel IV, grandson, representative of the 3rd district of Batangas, son of Jose Laurel Jr.
 Francis Castillo-Laurel, grandson
 Antonio "Tony" Castillo-Laurel, grandson
 Jose "Joey" C. Laurel V, grandson, Ambassador Extraordinary and Plenipotentiary, Philippine Ambassador to Japan, governor of Batangas
 Mercedes "Ditas" Laurel-Marquez, granddaughter 
 Maria Elena "Marilen" Laurel-Loinaz, granddaughter 
 Christine C. Laurel, granddaughter 
 Benjamin "Benjie" C. Laurel+, grandson
 Eduardo C. Laurel+, grandson
 Susanna "Susie" D. Laurel-Delgado, granddaughter 
 Celine "Lynnie" D. Laurel-Castillo
 Victor "Cocoy" D. Laurel, actor and singer
 Iwi Laurel-Asensio, granddaughter, singer and entrepreneur
 Patty Laurel, granddaughter, TV host and former MTV VJ
 Camille Isabella I. Laurel, UNIDO Party list, great-granddaughter
 Ann Maria Margarette I. Laurel great-granddaughter
 Jose Antonio Miguel I. Laurel, great-grandson
 Franco Laurel, great-grandson, singer and actor
 Rajo Laurel, great-grandson, fashion designer
 Denise Laurel, great-granddaughter, actress and singer
 Nicole Laurel Asensio, great-granddaughter, lead singer of General Luna band.

See also 
 Laurel incident

Notes

References

Sources 
 
 
 
 
 
 
 President Jose P. Laurel 
 President of the Philippines José Paciano Laurel's address, Greater East Asia Conference, November 5–6, 1943

External links

 
 The Jose P. Laurel Memorial Foundation
 The Philippine Presidency Project
 

|-

|-

|-

|-

 
1891 births
1959 deaths
Associate Justices of the Supreme Court of the Philippines
Colegio de San Juan de Letran alumni
Filipino academics
Filipino collaborators with Imperial Japan
Filipino expatriates in Japan
Filipino expatriates in the United States
20th-century Filipino judges
Filipino Roman Catholics
KALIBAPI politicians
Jose P.
Lyceum of the Philippines University
Majority leaders of the Senate of the Philippines
Nacionalista Party politicians
People from Tanauan, Batangas
Candidates in the 1949 Philippine presidential election
Presidents of the Philippines
Recipients of Philippine presidential pardons
Secretaries of Justice of the Philippines
Secretaries of the Interior and Local Government of the Philippines
Senators of the 2nd Congress of the Philippines
Senators of the 3rd Congress of the Philippines
Senators of the 8th Philippine Legislature
Senators of the 7th Philippine Legislature
Shooting survivors
Tagalog people
Filipino independence activists
Filipino Freemasons
University of the Philippines alumni
University of the Philippines College of Law alumni
Academic staff of the University of the Philippines
University of Santo Tomas alumni
World War II political leaders
Yale Law School alumni
Heads of government who were later imprisoned
Filipino politicians of Chinese descent
People charged with treason
Prisoners and detainees of the United States military